The following is a list of terrestrial vertebrate fauna of Mount Tây Côn Lĩnh, western Vị Xuyên District, Hà Giang Province, Vietnam, adapted from Nguyen, et al. (2004). The survey was conducted from 2001 to 2002 in the communes of Cao Bồ, Xín Chải, and Lao Chải. Additional species from Lunde, et al. (2003) are also listed.

Mammals
There are 47 mammalian species from 22 families and 8 orders.

Eulipotyphla
Soricidae
Suncus murinus
Blarinella griselda
Chodsigoa caovansunga
Chodsigoa parca
Crocidura attenuata
Crocidura fuliginosa
Crocidura wuchihensis

Scandentia
Tupaiidae
Tupaia glis
Talpidae
Scaptonyx fusicaudus

Chiroptera
Hipposideridae
Hipposideros armiger
Vespertilionidae
Pipistrellus sp.
Pteropodidae
Cynopterus sphinx
Rousettus leschenaulti
Sphaerias blanfordi

Primates
Lorisidae
Xanthonycticebus pygmaeus
Cercopithecidae
Macaca arctoides
Macaca mulatta
Macaca assamensis
Rhinopithecus avunculus
Hylobatidae
Hylobates concolor

Carnivora
Canidae
Nyctereutes procyonoides
Ursidae
Ursus thibetanus
Ursus malayanus
Mustelidae
Arctonyx collaris
Lutra lutra
Martes flavigula
Viverridae
Paguma larvata
Viverra zibetha
Viverricula indica
Paradoxurus hermaphroditus
Arctictis binturong
Herpestidae
Herpestes urva
Felidae
Felis bengalensis
Catopuma temminckii
Neofelis nebulosa
Panthera pardus

Artiodactyla
Suidae
Sus scrofa
Cervidae
Cervus unicolor
Muntiacus muntjak
Bovidae
Capricornis sumatraensis

Pholidota
Manidae
Manis pentadactyla

Rodentia
Pteromyini
Petaurista petaurista
Belomys pearsonii
Petaurista elegans
Sciurinae
Callosciurus erythraeus
Callosciurus inornatus
Tamiops maritimus
Dremomys rufigenis
Ratufa bicolor
Hystricidae
Acanthion subcristatum
Atherurus macrourus
Rhizomyidae
Rhizomys sumatrensis
Rhizomys pruinosus
Muridae
Rattus flavipectus
Mus musculus
Mus caroli
Rattus koratensis
Niviventer fulvescens
Niviventer langbianis
Niviventer tenaster
Leopoldamys edwardsi
Chiropodomys gliroides

Birds
There are 90 avian species from 32 families and 12 orders.

Podicipediformes
Podicipedidae
Tachybaptus ruficollis

Falconiformes
Accipitridae
Aviceda leuphotes
Pernis ptilorhynchus
Spilornis cheela
Accipiter nisus
Falconidae
Falco tinnunculus

Galliformes
Phasianidae
Coturnix chinensis
Gallus gallus

Gruiformes
Turnicidae
Turnix tanki

Columbiformes
Columbidae
Streptopelia chinensis
Chalcophaps indica

Cuculiformes
Cuculidae
Cuculus poliocephalus
Centropus sinensis

Strigiformes
Strigidae
Otus bakkamoena
Taenioptynx brodiei

Apodiformes
Apodidae
Cypsiurus batasiensis
Apus affinis

Trogoniformes
Trogonidae
Harpactes erythrocephalus

Coraciiformes
Alcedinidae
Alcedo atthis
Halcyon smyrnensis
Halcyon pileata
Meropidae
Nyctyornis athertoni
Merops viridis

Piciformes
Capitonidae
Megalaima franklinii
Megalaima asiatica
Picidae
Sasia ochracea
Picus canus

Passeriformes
Eurylaimidae
Psarisomus dalhousiae
Pittidae
Pitta oatesi
Hirundinidae
Hirundo rustica
Motacillidae
Motacilla cinerea
Motacilla alba
Campephagidae
Pericrocotus flammeus
Pycnonotidae
Pycnonotus jocosus
Hypsipetes mcclellandii
Alophoixus pallidus
Pycnonotus aurigaster
Pycnonotus finlaysoni
Laniidae
Lanius schach
Cinclidae
Cinclus pallasii
Turdidae
Cochoa viridis
Muscicapidae
Copsychus saularis
Phoenicurus fuliginosus
Enicurus scouleri
Enicurus schistaceus
Enicurus maculatus
Brachypteryx leucophrys
Myiophonus caeruleus
Timaliidae
Pomatorhinus ferruginosus
Jabouilleia danjoui
Napothera brevicaudata
Stachyris nigriceps
Erpornis zantholeuca
Macronus gularis
Garrulax maesi
Garrulax merulinus
Garrulax milnei
Leiothrix argentauris
Leiothrix lutea
Pteruthius melanotis
Actinodura ramsayi
Alcippe castaneceps
Alcippe morrisonia
Heterophasia melanoleuca
Paradoxornis verreauxi
Heterophasia picaoides
Sylviidae
Tesia olivea
Orthotomus sutorius
Phylloscopus inornatus
Seicercus poliogenys
Seicercus castaniceps
Abroscopus superciliaris
Phylloscopus davisoni
Muscicapidae
Ficedula monileger
Ficedula hyperythra
Niltava grandis
Niltava macgrigoriae
Muscicapa muttui
Niltava banyumas
Culicicapa ceylonensis
Paridae
Parus spilonotus
Nectariniidae
Aethopyga siparaja
Aethopyga saturata
Zosteropidae
Zosterops japonica
Estrildidae
Lonchura striata
Ploceidae
Passer montanus
Dicruridae
Dicrurus macrocercus
Dicrurus leucophaeus
Dicrurus remifer
Dicrurus hottentottus

Reptiles
Reptile species from Ziegler, et al. (2014), which lists reptile species from all of Hà Giang Province, have also been added. Surveys were conducted from 2006-2008 in Tùng Vài forest, Quản Bạ District, Hà Giang Province. Ziegler, et al. (2014) listed Gekko palmatus, Sphenomorphus indicus, Ptyas major, Ptyas multicinctus, Euprepiophis mandarinus, Lycodon meridionalis, Oligodon chinensis, Oreocryptophis porphyraceus, Orthriophis taeniurus, Pseudoxenodon macrops, Rhabdophis subminiatus, and Sinomicrurus macclellandii as new records for Hà Giang.

Lacertilia
Gekkonidae
Gekko gecko
Gekko cf. palmatus
Hemidactylus frenatus
Agamidae
Acanthosaura lepidogaster
Physignathus cocincinus
Pseudocalotes brevipes
Lacertidae
Takydromus sexlineatus
Takydromus kuehnei
Scincidae
Ateuchosaurus chinensis
Eutropis longicaudata
Eutropis multifasciatus
Plestiodon chinensis
Plestiodon tamdaoensis
Scincella reevesii
Sphenomorphus indicus
Tropidophorus hainanus
Anguidae
Ophisaurus harti = Dopasia harti

Serpentes
Colubridae
Ahaetulla prasina
Calamaria septentrionalis
Coelognathus radiatus
Dendrelaphis ngansonensis
Dendrelaphis pictus
Enhydris plumbea
Euprepiophis mandarinus
Fowlea flavipunctatus
Hebius khasiensis
Hebius modestus
Lycodon meridionalis
Lycodon futsingensis
Oligodon chinensis
Oligodon taeniatus
Opisthotropis sp.
Oreocryptophis porphyraceus
Orthriophis taeniurus
Pareas hamptoni
Pseudoxenodon bambusicola
Pseudoxenodon karlschmidti
Pseudoxenodon macrops
Ptyas korros
Ptyas major
Ptyas multicinctus
Rhabdophis subminiatus
Sinonatrix aequifasciata
Sinonatrix percarinatus
Elapidae
Naja naja
Ophiophagus hannah
Sinomicrurus macclellandii
Viperidae
Deinagkistrodon acutus
Ovophis tonkinensis
Protobothrops cornutus
Protobothrops mucrosquamatus
Protobothrops maolanensis
Trimeresurus stejnegeri
Trimeresurus albolabris
Pythonidae
Python bivittatus

Testudinata
Platysternidae
Platysternon megacephalum
Geoemydidae
Cuora mouhotii
Mauremys mutica
Sacalia quadriocellata
Testudinidae
Manouria impressa
Trionychidae
Palea steindachneri
Pelodiscus sinensis

Amphibians
Amphibian species from Ziegler, et al. (2014), which lists amphibian species from all of Hà Giang Province, have also been added. Surveys were conducted from 2006-2008 in Tùng Vài forest, Quản Bạ District, Hà Giang Province. Ziegler, et al. (2014) listed Hyla annectans, Babina chapaensis, Odorrana jingdongensis, Odorrana junlianensis, Gracixalus jinxiuensis, Rhacophorus duboisi, Rhacophorus feae, and Rhacophorus robertingeri as new records for Hà Giang.

Caudata
Salamandridae
Tylototriton ziegleri

Anura
Discoglossidae
Bombina maxima
Megophryidae
Leptobrachium chapaense
Brachytarsophrys feae
Ophryophryne microstoma
Megophrys sp.
Leptolalax lateralis
Leptolalax pelodytoides
Leptolalax nyx
Xenophrys major
Xenophrys palpebralespinosa
Xenophrys parva
Bufonidae
Duttaphrynus melanostictus
Hylidae
Hyla annectans
Ranidae
Rana johnsi
Amolops iriodes
Amolops ricketti
Babina chapaensis
Odorrana livida
Odorrana geminata
Odorrana chloronota
Odorrana cf. jingdongensis
Odorrana junlianensis
Odorrana tiannanensis
Hylarana macrodactyla
Hylarana maosonensis
Hylarana taipehensis
Limnonectes kuhlii
Limnonectes cf. bannaensis
Fejervarya limnocharis
Hoplobatrachus rugulosus
Nanorana delacouri
Quasipaa spinosa
Quasipaa verrucospinosa
Quasipaa boulengeri
 Sylvirana guentheri
Rhacophoridae
Gracixalus gracilipes
Gracixalus cf. jinxiuensis
Kurixalus cf. bisacculus
Kurixalus maosonensis
Kurixalus appendiculatus
Raorchestes gryllus
Raorchestes parvulus
Philautus odontotarsus
Philautus sp. 1
Theloderma asperum
Theloderma cf. corticale
Theloderma rhododiscus
Rhacophorus duboisi
Rhacophorus feae
Rhacophorus hoanglienensis
Rhacophorus puerensis
Rhacophorus robertingeri
Rhacophorus hoanglienensis
Rhacophorus dugritei
Rhacophorus kio
Rhacophorus rhodopus
Polypedates leucomystax
Polypedates megacephalus
Microhylidae
Microhyla butleri
Microhyla heymonsi
Microhyla pulchra

Endangered species
Endangered species include:
Macaca arctoides
Hylobates concolor
Ursus malayanus
Ursus thibetanus
Catopuma temminckii
Neofelis nebulosa
Panthera pardus
Capricornis sumatraensis
Psarisomus dalhousiae
Jabouilleia danjoui
Garrulax merulinus
Enicurus scouleri
Palea steindachneri
Pelodiscus sinensis
Ophiophagus hannah
Physignathus cocincinus
Naja naja
Paa spinosa

See also
Wildlife of Vietnam

References

Dang Huy Phuong, Hoang Minh Khien, Le Manh Hung, Nguyen Quang Truong. 2004. Results of the survey on the animal fauna of the Tay Con Linh mountain area, Ha Giang province. Tap Chi Sinh Hoc, 26(2): 21-29.

Fauna of Vietnam
Environment of Vietnam
Natural history of Vietnam
Hà Giang province